Natalya Sorokivskaya (born 23 July 1962) is a Kazakhstani female former long-distance runner who competed for the Soviet Union and later Kazakhstan. She competed in track, road and cross country running disciplines. She holds the Kazakhstani national records from 3000 metres to the 10K run and also the half marathon record.

She was a seven-time participant at the IAAF World Cross Country Championships between 1987 and 1994, with her best performance being on her debut when she came tenth. She was part of the winning Soviet women's team in 1989, alongside Nadezhda Stepanova, Yelena Romanova, and Regina Chistyakova. She also won team bronze medals in 1987 and 1991.

Sorokivskaya won two 10,000 metres bronze medals on the track for the Soviet Union, first at the 1987 European Cup and then at the 1989 IAAF World Cup. She was twice national champion on the track, taking the 10,000 m at the 1989 Soviet Athletics Championships and the 5000 metres title at the 1990 Soviet Indoor Athletics Championships.

She had her first national podium finish in 1986, coming third over 5000 m and represented the Soviet Union at the 1986 Goodwill Games as a result. She took a team gold medal at the IAAF World Road Relay Championships in 1994. She also represented the Soviet women's team at the International Chiba Ekiden in 1988 and 1991, the Yokohama International Women's Ekiden in 1990, 1991, 1992 and 1995, and the Beijing International Women's Ekiden in 1992 and 1994. On the professional circuit, she was runner-up at the Egmond Half Marathon, Tilburg 10K and Eurocross in 1993, runner-up at the 4 Mijl van Groningen and Tilburg 5-miler in 1995, and third-placer at the 1995 Frankfurt Half Marathon.

International competitions

National titles
Soviet Athletics Championships
10,000 m: 1989
Soviet Indoor Athletics Championships
5000 m: 1990

References

External links

Living people
1962 births
Soviet female long-distance runners
Kazakhstani female long-distance runners
Competitors at the 1986 Goodwill Games